The Sunken barges of Bridgeport are several ships sunk in Bridgeport Harbor, Bridgeport, Connecticut:

Berkshire No. 7 - Built in 1935 and sunk in 1974. National Register of Historic Places (NRHP) listed
Priscilla Dailey - Built in 1929 and sunk in 1974. NRHP listed
Elmer S. Dailey - Built in 1915 and sunk in 1974. NRHP listed

Buildings and structures in Bridgeport, Connecticut